Chhuqu P'ukru (Quechua chhuqu narrow; rectangular, p'ukru hole, pit, gap in a surface, "narrow gap", hispanicized spelling Chujupucro) is a mountain in the northern part of the Paryaqaqa mountain range in the Andes of Peru which reaches an altitude of approximately  . It is located in the Junín Region, Yauli Province, in the districts of Huay-Huay and Suitucancha. Chhuqu P'ukru lies between Chumpi in the north and Qayqu in the south.

References

Mountains of Peru
Mountains of Junín Region